"Say You Don't Want It" is a song by English indie pop band One Night Only, released as the first and only single from their second album. It had its first play on Greg James's Radio 1 show on 25 June 2010.

Music video
The music video, filmed in New York City and directed by James Lees, first aired on Channel 4 on 26 June 2010. It features actress Emma Watson. George Craig originally became friends with Watson after they both featured in a Burberry modelling campaign.
Gray's Papaya features prominently among several New York landmarks in the video.

Track listing

UK CD single
"Say You Don't Want It" (radio edit) – 3:37
"Daydream" – 3:12
"Say You Don't Want It" (video) – 4:08
"Say You Don't Want It" (behind the scenes) – 6:38

Digital download
"Say You Don't Want It" (radio edit) – 3:37
"Say You Don't Want It" (video) – 4:08

Charts

References

One Night Only (band) songs
2010 singles
Song recordings produced by Ed Buller
2010 songs
Mercury Records singles
Songs written by Ed Buller
Songs written by George Craig (musician)